Small Sacrifices is a 1989 American made-for-television crime drama film written by Joyce Eliason and based on the best-selling true crime book by Ann Rule of the same name. The film is about Diane Downs and the murder and attempted murder of her three children. It stars Farrah Fawcett, Ryan O'Neal, Gordon Clapp, John Shea and Emily Perkins. The film premiered in two parts on ABC on November 12 and 14, 1989.

Plot
On 19 May 1983 at approximately 10:48 p.m, Diane Downs, drives to McKenzie-Willamette Hospital in Springfield, Oregon with a gunshot wound to her arm. She claims that an unknown assailant attempted to carjack her and shot her three children: Karen, 8, Shauna, 7, and Robby, 3. 
Her eldest daughter Karen was suffering a temporary loss of speech due to a stroke after the shooting, but recovers sufficiently to serve as a witness in court against her mother; Diane's son is paralyzed due to the gunshot. She was eventually tried and convicted of murder and attempted murder. During the trial, the prosecution plays Duran Duran's "Hungry Like the Wolf" to demonstrate to the jury Diane's choice of song used to motivate her to kill.

Diane Downs is sentenced to life in prison, and her two surviving children are adopted by the prosecutor Frank Joziak and his wife, Lola.

Differences from book
Downs' children Christie, Cheryl and Danny were renamed Karen, Shauna and Robbie for the film. Her ex-husband, Steve, was renamed Boyd Paul. The prosecutor and his wife who later adopted Christie and Danny were also renamed. In both the book and movie Downs' lover, Robert Knickerbocker, was renamed Lew Lewiston.

Cast
Farrah Fawcett as Diane Downs
Ryan O'Neal as Lew Lewiston 
Gordon Clapp as Detective Doug Welch 
John Shea as Frank Joziak 
Garry Chalk as Boyd Paul Downs 
Emily Perkins as Karen Downs 
Ken James as Robby Downs
Sean McCann as Russell Wells 
Lynne Cormack as Lola Joziak 
Maxine Miller as Verla Mae Wells
Vicki Wauchope as Shauna Downs
Timothy Sell as The Stranger (Carjacker)

Reception
Upon its broadcast, the film was met with wide acclaim. It scored three Emmy Award nominations, including Outstanding Comedy/Drama Special and Outstanding Lead Actress in a Miniseries or Special (Farrah Fawcett). It was also awarded a Peabody Award, which cited the high quality of Fawcett's performance: "This terrifying true story, based on Ann Rule’s best-selling book, marked a high point in television drama for 1989. At the heart of the chilling tale of a mother’s mental illness and unthinking cruelty is the performance of Farrah Fawcett. With this portrayal, Farrah Fawcett has forever put to rest the image of her talents associated with Charlie’s Angels. Ably assisted by Ryan O’Neal, with exceptional writing by Joyce Eliason and direction by David Greene, Ms. Fawcett brings a sense of realism rarely seen in television miniseries. For a drama of unusual power, a Peabody Award to Small Sacrifices."

See also
List of television films produced for American Broadcasting Company

References

External links
 
 

1989 television films
1989 films
1989 crime drama films
American crime drama films
American television films
Films directed by David Greene
Films set in 1983
Films set in Oregon
Films shot in Edmonton
Films about narcissism
Peabody Award-winning broadcasts
Crime films based on actual events
1980s English-language films
1980s American films